Katehri, also spelled as Katehari,  is a town in Ambedkar Nagar district in the Indian state of Uttar Pradesh. Katehri is also a block in Ambedkar Nagar district, Uttar Pradesh.

Katehari is a constituency of the Uttar Pradesh Legislative Assembly covering the city of Katehari in the Ambedkar Nagar district of Uttar Pradesh, India.

Katehari is one of five assembly constituencies in the Ambedkar Nagar Lok Sabha constituency. Since 2008, this assembly constituency is numbered 277 amongst 403 constituencies.

Katehri is also having a Railway station which is recently renovated by Indian Railway. It is now having fully electrified route. 

School and Colleges in Katehari 

1- Junior Madhyamik School, Katehari 

2- Primary (English medium) School, Katehari 

3- Ram Dev Janta Inter college,Katehari 

4- BBS Public School, Katehari 

5- Vedmurti Taponishtha Shree Ram Sharma Acharya Inter college, Katehari 

6- Dev Bal School, Katehari 

7- Dev Indravati PG College, Katehari 

8- Vidushi College of Pharmacy, Katehari 

9- Dashrath Verma Mahavidylaya, Katehari 

10-Malti Modern Public Inter college, Katehari

Nearly Kasba
 Akbarpur 11KM
 Tanda 25KM
 Jalalpur 32KM
 Baskhari 27KM
 Rajesultanpur 82KM
 Jahangir Ganj 65KM

References

Cities and towns in Ambedkar Nagar district